WSUM (91.7 MHz FM) is a student radio station in Madison, Wisconsin, affiliated with the University of Wisconsin–Madison.  The station schedule consists of a wide range of music and talk programming serving the campus and Madison community.

History
The radio station, which was known as WLHA, began in 1952, but went off the air in 1993. It restarted when a group of volunteers, including Stephen Thompson, a member of a former student radio group, founder of the Onion AV page and now of National Public Radio, and Dean Troyer, the newly elected Student Services Finance Chair, submitted a budget and proposal to the SSFC, the Associated Students of Madison and the UW–Madison administration.  Dr. James Hoyt, former chair of the UW–Madison School of Journalism, and General Manager Dave Black, a journalism graduate student at the university, were asked to lead the effort to bring a student radio station back to UW-Madison. The university approved the project in June, 1995.  The key to the proposal was getting Dr. Hoyt and Dave Black involved to add long-term stability to the project and getting the administration to apply for the FCC license.  The station began in 1997 with an internet-only broadcast. In 2001, the FCC agreed to a radio tower to be built in the town of Montrose in southern Dane County. The proposal was met with contention from local citizens of Montrose, but after a lengthy legal battle, the tower was constructed and terrestrial broadcasting of WSUM began on February 22, 2002, at 2:22 PM.

Since then, WSUM has expanded to near-24/7 programming. The station currently has over 250 members.

Programming
Programming on WSUM is entirely free-form, in that hosts are allowed to completely program their own show. Programming schedules operate on a semesterly schedule. A typical schedule consists of a variety of sports, talk shows, and music shows, including indie rock, funk, house music, folk, and community affairs. Most of the programmers are students (of any area college), although there are some community members with shows.

On Wisconsin Radio 
On Wisconsin Radio is the station's flagship public affairs program. The show covers the Badgers and everything Wisconsin, featuring the latest in political news, sports, music, culture, and community events through quality journalism, creative pre-production and energetic live performance. Previous guests include politicians Senator Tammy Baldwin, Mary Burke, and Madison mayor Paul Soglin, comedians Julian McCullough, Christopher Titus, Steve Byrne, and Adam Cayton-Holland, and former Green Bay Packer Ahman Green.

The podcast debuted in February 2015.

Student Staff
Educating future broadcasters is one of the core objectives of WSUM, according to its mission statement. As such, the staff at WSUM operates much as a professional radio station. The station manager is elected each year in November by the members of WSUM, while the rest of the staff is hired by the station manager. The program director is primarily in charge of scheduling shows and training future hosts each semester. The music director is primarily in charge of talking to promoters and planning Snake on the Lake. The production director creates on-air fare for the station.

The general manager, currently Kelsey Brannen, oversees the student staff and liaises with the administration for budget and other issues.

WSUM sports
The WSUM Sports Department provides UW-Madison students hands-on experience in the field of sports broadcasting. WSUM Sports offers numerous sports talk shows throughout the week, all of which are entirely produced and hosted by students. In addition, WSUM provides live play-by-play coverage of Wisconsin football, men's and women's basketball, and men's and women's hockey on its online sports stream. The station also has an exclusive partnership with the official website of Wisconsin athletics, to broadcast Badger softball and women's hockey games. In January 2010, the WSUM Sports Department began an exclusive partnership to provide the on-air talent for the Big Ten Network as a part of its "Student-U" initiative.

Online sports stream
The WSUM online sports stream launched in October, 2008, with a broadcast of Wisconsin vs. Ohio State in football. Coverage has since expanded to include men's and women's basketball, men's and women's hockey, and women's softball. In October, 2009, WSUM Sports traveled to Minneapolis to broadcast its first road game: Wisconsin vs. Minnesota football. WSUM has since covered every Wisconsin football road Big Ten game, select away men's basketball games, The Rose Bowl, The Big Ten Conference men's basketball tournament, Women's Hockey Frozen Four, WCHA Final Five, and The 2010 NCAA Division I Men's Ice Hockey Tournament.

Party in the Park
Each year, WSUM puts together a free music festival that is funded through donations and fundraising events. The event was originally known as Party in the Park and was held in James Madison Park, near the UW–Madison Campus. The festival has drawn bands from around the country including The White Stripes, Andrew WK, …And You Will Know Us by the Trail of Dead.

Snake on the Lake Fest
In 2007 the festival was moved to the Union Terrace and renamed the "Snake on the Lake Fest". Rock and roll band The Ponys headlined at the 2008 Snake on the Lake Fest, drawing a large crowd to the event. Ryan Leslie headlined the 2013 SOTL. Saint Pepsi headlined the 2014 event at The Sett in Union South. Burial Hex headlined the 2015 event.

In 2016, the Snake on the Lake Fest moved its location to a local venue in Madison, the Frequency with the band Whitney has the fest's headliner.

References

Sources

SUM
University of Wisconsin–Madison
SUM
Freeform radio stations